The KAF-10500 is a CCD imaging sensor designed by US photographic company Eastman Kodak. In September 2006 it was announced that the sensor was to be used in the Leica M8 digital rangefinder camera, having been specifically designed for this application. Its size is 18x27 mm (APS-H) and it has 10.3 million pixels of size 6.8 μm. Compared to 35mm film, it has a 1.33 crop factor. It is calibrated for an ISO sensitivity range of 160–2500.

The sensor includes indium tin oxide as a constituent material, which Kodak claims leads to low noise, high sensitivity, and wide dynamic range. It is designed for use with lenses with short back focal lengths – such as those common to rangefinder cameras – by including a microlens array to reduce fall off in intensity from the center to corners of the image. Further details and aspects of the sensor were unveiled during the course of photokina 2006.

References 

Image sensors
Kodak